Telmatobius vellardi is a species of frog in the family Telmatobiidae.
It is endemic to Ecuador.
Its natural habitats are subtropical or tropical moist montane forest, subtropical or tropical high-altitude shrubland, subtropical or tropical high-altitude grassland, and rivers.
It is threatened by habitat loss.

References

vellardi
Amphibians of the Andes
Amphibians of Ecuador
Endemic fauna of Ecuador
Taxonomy articles created by Polbot
Amphibians described in 1959